Jackson Township is a township in Winneshiek County, Iowa, USA.

History
Jackson Township was established in 1882.

References

Townships in Winneshiek County, Iowa
Townships in Iowa